Johanna Leigh Griggs  (born 17 October 1973) is an Australian television presenter and former competitive swimmer. She won a bronze medal at the 1990 Commonwealth Games.

Griggs has been at the Seven Network since 1993 where she joined Seven Sport, first as a host at the Australian Open. She hosts the network's Olympic Games, Commonwealth Games and the Australian Open, as well as being a presenter of their Melbourne Cup coverage. She has been the host of Better Homes and Gardens since 2005 and House Rules from 2013 until 2019.

Commonwealth Games – swimming career
Griggs represented Australia at the Auckland Commonwealth Games in 1990—winning a bronze medal in the 100m backstroke event.

Her career was cut short after a battle with chronic fatigue syndrome that began when she was 17. She had previously attempted a comeback in 1992; however, the exertion of that comeback attempt had hospitalised her with pleurisy, and it ultimately caused her to withdraw from the 1992 Olympic trials. Nevertheless, she was able to successfully make a comeback in 1993 for the 50-metre backstroke race at the Australian Swimming Championships in 1993, where Griggs recorded the fastest time in the world (that year) for the event. The day following that swim, she announced her retirement from competitive swimming.

Television career
Griggs was the first guest on the long-running ABC programme Live and Sweaty. As part of the programme, sporting guests were asked to donate various body parts to the "Sporting Hall of Fame". Griggs donated her appendix.

She appeared as a Swedish tourist in an episode of Home and Away in 1992.

Griggs built a solid career in media, and in the late 1990s was a regular panelist on the Network Ten program Beauty and the Beast. At this time she was also dating rugby league footballer Luke Ricketson.

She later joined the Seven Network. Griggs hosted Australia's longest-running sports program, Sportsworld, with Matthew White on Sunday mornings from 2001 to 2006.

Griggs hosted several seasons of lifestyle type shows, including Auction Squad and House Calls to the Rescue. She participated in the Australian Open coverage, and she was the first Australian woman to solely host an Olympics coverage when she covered the 2002 Winter Olympics in Salt Lake City.

In 2005, she replaced Noni Hazlehurst as the primary host of the long-running lifestyle program Better Homes and Gardens.

In 2009, after previously acting as a fill-in presenter for Seven News Sydney weekend sports bulletin, she took on the role full-time, replacing Alex Cullen, who moved to the weeknight role. In November 2010, Griggs resigned from Seven News to spend more time with her family.

Griggs covers several sporting events for Seven Sport.

Griggs was critical of organisers of the 2018 Commonwealth Games when the competitors were not included in the closing ceremony.

Personal life
Griggs was born in the Sydney suburb of Harbord which is now known as Freshwater.

Griggs, who was previously married to actor Gary Sweet, has two sons.

On 25 November 2006, Griggs married building foreman Todd Huggins in a private ceremony at their home in Collaroy Plateau, Sydney.

In September 2009, Griggs was awarded an honorary Doctor of Letters from Macquarie University, Sydney.

References

External links
 

1973 births
Living people
People with chronic fatigue syndrome
Australian female backstroke swimmers
Australian television presenters
Commonwealth Games bronze medallists for Australia
Swimmers at the 1990 Commonwealth Games
Commonwealth Games medallists in swimming
Australian women television presenters
Members of the Order of Australia
Medallists at the 1990 Commonwealth Games